Common names: Malayan ground pit viper, Malayan pit viper, Malayan ground snake, Malayan moccasin.Calloselasma is a monotypic genus created for a venomous pit viper species, Calloselasma rhodostoma, which is endemic to Southeast Asia from Thailand to northern Malaysia and on the island of Java. No subspecies are currently recognized.

Description

Dorsally it is reddish, grayish, or pale brown, with two series of large, dark brown, black-edged triangular blotches, which are alternating or opposite. There is also a thin dark brown vertebral stripe, which may be interrupted or indistinct in some specimens. The upper labials are pink or yellowish, and powdered with brown. There is a broad, dark brown, black-edged diagonal stripe from the eye to the corner of the mouth, with a narrower light-colored stripe above it. Ventrally it is yellowish, uniform or powdered or spotted with grayish brown.

The smooth dorsal scales are arranged in 21 rows at midbody. Ventrals 138-157; anal plate entire; subcaudals 34-54 pairs.

Snout pointed and upturned. Rostral as deep as broad. Two internasals and two prefrontals. Frontal as long as or slightly longer than its distance from tip of snout, as long as or slightly shorter than the parietals. 7-9 upper labials. Loreal pit not in contact with the upper labials.

This is the only Asian pit viper with large crown scales and smooth dorsal scales.

Geographic range
Found in Nepal, Thailand, Cambodia, Laos, Vietnam, northern West Malaysia and on the Indonesian island of Java. The type locality is listed as "Java". There are unconfirmed, but credible reports from southern Myanmar (Burma), northern Sumatra and northern Borneo.

Habitat and diet
Prefers coastal forests, bamboo thickets, unused and overgrown farmland, orchards, plantations as well as forests around plantations, where it searches for rats and mice.

Reproduction
This species is oviparous and the eggs are guarded by the female after deposition.

Venom
This species has a reputation for being bad-tempered and quick to strike. In northern Malaysia it is responsible for some 700 incidents of snakebite annually with a mortality rate of about 2 percent. Remarkably sedentary, it has often been found in the same spot several hours after an incident involving humans. Its venom causes severe pain and local swelling and sometimes tissue necrosis, but deaths are not common. Many victims are left with dysfunctional or amputated limbs due to the lack of antivenom and early treatment. In a 2005 study of 225 Malayan pit viper (Calloselasma rhodostoma) bites in Thailand, most victims had mild to moderate symptoms, but 27 of 145 patients (18.6%) developed permanently swollen limbs. There were only two deaths (related to intracerebral hemorrhage) and no amputations. The antivenin manufactured in Thailand seemed effective in reversing the blood clotting caused by the venom. Most patients remained stable and did not require antivenin. The authors suggested that victims not use traditional healers and avoid overuse of tourniquets. In a prospective phase of the study,  bites occurred throughout the year but mostly early in the monsoon season (May and June).

Venom and thrombosis treatment
The venom of this species is used to isolate a thrombin-like enzyme called ancrod. This enzyme is used clinically to break down and dissolve thrombi (blood clots) in patients and lower blood viscosity to help prevent heart attack and stroke.Guangmei Yan, Jiashu Chen, Pengxin Qiu, Hong Shan. "Fibrinolysin of Agkistrodon acutus Venom and its Usage."

References

Further reading
 Kuhl, H. 1824. Sur les Reptiles de Java. Bull Sci. nat. Géol. 2: 79-83. (Trigonocephalus rhodostoma'')

External links

 
 C. rhodostoma at Thailand Snakes. Accessed 21 Dec 2014.

Crotalinae
Monotypic snake genera
Reptiles of Indonesia
Reptiles of Malaysia
Reptiles of Thailand
Snakes of Asia
Taxa named by Edward Drinker Cope
Reptiles described in 1824